

Armando Ramon

Armando Ramon (alternately spelled Armando Ramone and also known as Reverb, Rupture and Hardline) is the older brother of Cisco Ramon / Vibe and Dante Ramon. Created by Gerry Conway and Chuck Patton, the character first appeared in Justice League of America #233 (December 1984). He was a street gang's leader in Detroit, but gave it up after being inspired by his brother's actions as the superhero Vibe of the Justice League of America. Like Vibe, Ramon has the metahuman power to manipulate sound waves. Ramon joined the corporate-sponsored Conglomerate superhero team. He has used three different aliases over the years: Reverb, Rupture, and Hardline.

Armando Ramon in other media
Armando Ramon's role as Cisco's (portrayed by Carlos Valdes) older brother is incorporated into The Flashs incarnation of Dante Ramon, portrayed by Nicholas Gonzalez. Additionally, elements of Armando as Reverb and Rupture are incorporated into Cisco and Dante's Earth-2 doppelgangers (also portrayed by Valdes and Gonzalez, respectively).

Dante Ramon

Dante Ramon is a brother of Cisco Ramon / Vibe and Armando Ramon. Created by Andrew Kreisberg, Geoff Johns and Pete Woods, he first appeared in Justice League of America's Vibe #1 (April 2013).

Dante Ramon in other media
Variations of Dante Ramon, amalgamated with Armando Ramon, appears in The Flash, portrayed by Nicholas Gonzalez.
 The Earth-1 version takes Armando's place as Cisco's older brother, with whom has a rocky relationship. In season two, he and Cisco fend off his own doppelgänger, which leads to them reconciling. In season three, as a result of Barry Allen creating and undoing the "Flashpoint" timeline, Dante was killed in a car accident, briefly straining Cisco and Allen's friendship.
 The Earth-2 version is Rupture, an enforcer for Zoom who appears in season two. He attacks Cisco, having been misled into believing the latter killed his brother Reverb, but is stopped by Allen and killed by Zoom for his failure.

Ravan

Raven

Red Arrow

Red Lantern
Red Lantern is a fictional character appearing in American comic books published by DC Comics.

In his panel within the pages of "The New Golden Age" #1, there was a character who went by the name Red Lantern and predated the Red Lantern Corps. Vladimir Sokov was a soldier in the Soviet Union's Red Army. When Red Labs created a red lantern and ring that tapped into the Crimson Flame so that they can have an answer for Green Lantern, Vladimir become Red Lantern as well as becoming Russia's first superhero. While Red Lantern was unable to take down Green Lantern on Russia's behalf, they have had brief truces when fighting Nazis that threatened North America and Russia. When Vladimir's daughter was born in 1951, he found that she inherited his Crimson Flame power and developed glowing red skin. Against Vladimir's will, his daughter was taken to Red Labs so that the scientists there can study him. Red Lantern attacked Red Labs and burned the scientists studying his daughter before engaging the Red Army. While it was stated that Red Lantern perished, neither his body, his ring, the red lantern, or his daughter were ever found. By the final issue of "Flashpoint Beyond", Red Lantern was among the thirteen missing Golden Age superheroes in the Time Masters' capsules. When those capsules have failed, they were all pulled back to their own time with history rebuilding around them.

Red Star

Red Tool
Wayne Wilkins, a.k.a. Red Tool, first appeared in Harley Quinn (vol. 2) #3 (April 2014). A parody of Wade Wilson / Deadpool, he is a vigilante from a future Batman-obsessed society obsessed with Harley Quinn, to the point of stalking and kidnapping her. At first, Harley did not like him, but they have since become good friends and close allies.

Powers and abilities of Red Tool
Red Tool does not feel pain after a surgery that removed a brain tumor and parts of his amygdala. Red Tool uses tools and hardware appliances for weapons and has a bionic arm.

Red Tornado

Reign

Reign is a powerful alien enemy of Supergirl. She is a Worldkiller, an alien embryo genetically modified and grown in a clandestine Kryptonian laboratory. Reign is gifted with superhuman strength, speed and endurance and is an adept swordswoman and hand-to-hand combatant.

Reign and four other Worldkillers were created by Zor-El, who later came to regret his part in the creation of those blood-thirsty, super-powerful monsters. Reign and her partners survived Krypton, but her origin remained a mystery even to her. All she knew about herself is her name and her being Worldkiller, and Krypton and Earth hold the answers to her origin.

When she tried to get to Krypton she found out that it was dead. However, Reign found Supergirl and followed her back to the remains of Argo City, hoping to find anything about their origin. Reign faced and beat Supergirl down, but Kara Zor-El could not provide any answers so Reign left Supergirl for dead and headed back to Earth to conquer the planet, starting with New York City. She was stopped by Supergirl's return to Earth while Reign thought Supergirl would join her, but the young Kryptonian refused to. Reign and three of her Worldkiller partners fought an exhausted Supergirl, but the young hero managed to hurt one of them. Unwilling to take the risk of losing one of her soldiers, Reign opted to retreat and leave Earth, vowing she would fight Supergirl again, and warning that she and her three partners are not the only Worldkillers.

Reign in other media
 Reign appears in Supergirl, portrayed by Odette Annable. Primarily appearing in the third season, this version was created by a group of Kryptonians called the Worldkiller Coven during Krypton's final days before they sent her off-world. Reign eventually landed on Earth, was adopted by a woman named Patricia, named Samantha "Sam" Arias, and became a single mother to Ruby who lives in National City. Initially unaware of her true nature, Sam eventually learns of the pod she arrived in from Patricia. Following a signal sent out by the pod, Sam discovers the hidden Fortress of Sanctuary, where a holographic projection of her creator Selena tasks her with purifying Earth and transforming it into a new Krypton. Reign gradually emerges as a separate personality and becomes a masked vigilante to carry out Selena's will, though Sam retains no memory of her actions. Reign's subsequent rampage brings her into conflict with Supergirl, who uses black Kryptonite to save Sam and seemingly kill Reign. While the Worldkiller Coven resurrect the latter as a separate being, Reign is ultimately weakened by Sam via water from the Fountain of Lilith and taken away by Kryptonian demons.
 Additionally, two alternate universe incarnations of Reign appear in the episode "It's a Super Life", both also portrayed by Annable.
 Reign appears as a playable character in Lego DC Super-Villains.

Alberto Reyes
Alberto "Ernesto" Reyes is the father of Jaime Reyes (the third Blue Beetle). He is a mechanic living in El Paso, Texas who owns his own garage, a former soldier in the U.S. Army, and the husband of Bianca Reyes and the father of Milagro Reyes. Created by Keith Giffen, John Rogers, and Cully Hamner, the character first appeared in Blue Beetle (vol. 7) #1 (May 2006).

Alberto Reyes in other media
Alberto Reyes appears in Teen Titans: The Judas Contract, voiced by David Zayas.

Bianca Reyes
Bianca Reyes is the mother of Jaime Reyes (the third Blue Beetle). She is a paramedic living in El Paso, Texas, the wife of Alberto Reyes and the mother of Milagro Reyes. Created by Keith Giffen, John Rogers, and Cully Hamner, she first appeared in Blue Beetle (vol. 7) #1 (May 2006).

Bianca Reyes in other media
Bianca Reyes appears in Teen Titans: The Judas Contract, voiced by Maria Canals-Barrera.

Rip Roar
Rip Roar is a character in DC Comics. He first appeared in Young Justice (vol. 1) #2, created by Peter David and Todd Nauck.

Rip Roar was a four-armed New God of Apokolips in the distant past, who stole a New Genesis 'Super-Cycle' and imprinted himself onto it so that it would follow his commands, shortly before he was sealed away and trapped on Earth. He remained locked up for centuries until super-team Young Justice accidentally reactivate the Super-Cycle, which obeyed its last programmed function and released him from his imprisonment. Despite their best efforts, Superboy, Red Tornado and Impulse are unable to defeat him, but Robin is able to break his will by asking the Super-Cycle to choose between Robin and Rip Roar. Faced with the revelation that the Super-Cycle that had been imprinted with his own identity has rejected him - essentially meaning that he rejected himself - Rip Roar freezes himself into rock.

Rip Roar in other media
 A loose interpretation of Rip Roar appears in the fifth season of Supergirl, portrayed by Nick Sagar. This version is Russell Rogers, a human medical researcher, an old friend of William Dey, and boyfriend of Andrea Rojas who was previously believed to have died several years prior, but was secretly captured by Leviathan and brainwashed into becoming their obedient servant. Additionally, his armor is equipped with tentacles. In the episode "Dangerous Liaisons", he is sent to steal a laser and a particle amplifier, only to foiled by Supergirl and the Martian Manhunter and taken into the Department of Extranormal Operations (DEO)'s custody. In "Confidence Women", Rojas discovers what happened and mounts two attempts to break Rogers out, with the second succeeding after Lena Luthor gives her the Acrata Medallion. Upon their escape, Rojas intends to run away with Rogers, but he is killed by a Leviathan sniper while a messenger reveals Rogers served his purpose and Rojas can access her powers without the medallion.

Robin

Robot Renegades
The Robot Renegades are a robotic team in the DC Comics universe.  Seeking the supremacy of machines over humans, they first appeared as a team in Metal Men (vol. 3) #2 (2007). In Metal Men (vol. 3) #3, they would assist Will Magnus in defeating the Death Metal Men, although purely for their own reasons.

Roster
U.N.I.O.N. – A union of nanobots that can concentrate themselves into "one" single massive robot or "disperse" themselves to infiltrate other machines. Later inhabited the body of a robot duplicate of T. O. Morrow, and though repeated requests to be exposed to the Karmarak's radiation to escape it, he was denied it by the Metal Men as the same radiation would have reawakened the Death Metal Men.

Warbox – The walking Arsenal. Its head is shaped like a bear's. A reel-to-reel tape player is attached to its chest (it says it "can't fight without music"). L-Ron implies he was commissioned for a Japanese singer.

Body X – A mechanical brain in a living woman's body. It sacrificed the woman's body in Metal Men (vol. 3) #3 to destroy the Death Metal Men.

L-Ron – Alien robot – formerly a heroic ally to the Justice League, now standing against humanity for unknown reasons.

Manhunter Lud – Part of the proto peacekeepers of the universe, the Manhunters, he has an eyepatch over his right eye. Later revealed to be an agent of The Nameless, covering the Nameless' signature Eye of Ra emblem under his eyepatch.

Rock
Rock is the name of a fictional character appearing in American comic books published by DC Comics.

Micah Flint was an astronaut who volunteered to participate in a program of genetic engineering that was intended to modify human physiology and anatomy in such a way as to render humans fit to sustain stays in outer space without much sophisticated technology. Although the program at first seemed to be a complete success it finally became clear that its success was achieved at a high price: as a consequence of the genetic experimentation he had been subjected to Flint's body gradually mutated into a rock-like creature. While retaining an anthropomorphic stature Flint's flesh picked up the consistency of rocks and his skin started to look like limestone. Blaming billionaire Lex Luthor, the owner of LexCorp and architect of the failed experiment, for his destiny, Flint - who now started calling himself Rock - raided Luthor's penthouse atop the LexCorp Headquarters in the LexCorp Tower. His attempt to slay Luthor was thwarted by Superman who defeated Rock in battle and handed him over to the authorities.

After escaping from imprisonment during a detainee transport - and a brief run-in with the alien known as Scorn who was serving as Superman's substitute. Rock was recruited into the Superman Revenge Squad by Morgan Edge.

Together with Parasite, Barrage, and Baud, he formed the second line-up of the post-Crisis Squad. Even though the unlikely quartet managed to lure Superman into a trap and to press him hard, the Man of Steel finally managed to outwit them once again defeating and capturing Rock in the process.

Later on, Rock was among several villains manipulated by Manchester Black into seeking out and attacking Superman's friends and family.

Rock later appeared as a member of the Injustice League Unlimited.

During the "Salvation Run" storyline, Rock was among a multitude of supervillains banished to live in the penal colony on the planet Salvation by the US government.

Rose Psychic
Rose Psychic is a DC Comics heroine affiliated with the company's first superhero, Doctor Occult. They both were created by Jerry Siegel and Joe Shuster, the creators of Superman. She first appeared in More Fun Comics #19 (March 1937).

Betsy Ross
Betsy Ross is a fictional character appearing in American comic books published by DC Comics.

In her panel seen within the pages of "The New Golden Age" #1, Elizabeth Rose is a school girl and the best friend of Molly Preacher. After seeing Miss America in action when their school is saved, they took on the costumed identities of Betsy Ross and Molly Pitcher to help her against a saboteur named Moth. On Betsy's part, she received spool of thread that associated with Betsy Ross from Miss America that enables her to make a special cape that enhances her strength and speed as well as granting her the ability to fly. Betsy Ross and Molly Pitcher were her sidekicks until the day when World War II ended where they mysteriously vanished. By the final issue of "Flashpoint Beyond", Betsy Ross was among the thirteen missing Golden Age superheroes in the Time Masters' capsules. When those capsules have failed, they were all pulled back to their own time with history rebuilding around them.

Betsy Ross and Molly Pitcher are among the Lost Children on Childminder's island.

Cullen Row
Cullen Row is a fictional character appearing in American comic books published by DC Comics. He debuted during "The New 52" reboot.

Cullen Row is the brother of Harper Row. When his bullies were gay-bashing him and Harper managed to tase one of them, Cullen was saved by Batman. Though the bullies managed to butcher Cullen's hair.

Cullen Row in other media
 Cullen Row appears in Young Justice, voiced by Benjamin Diskin. This version initially lives with an abusive father until he and Harper are adopted by Lucas and Bethany Carr.
 Cullen Row appears in Gotham Knights, portrayed by Tyler DiChiara. This version is a gay trans boy and a friend of Duela.

Harper Row

Arisia Rrab

References

 DC Comics characters: R, List of